Arafat is a suburb of Nouakchott and urban commune in western Mauritania. It is the capital of Nouakchott-Sud Region and had a population of 102,169 in 2000.

References

Communes of Mauritania
Nouakchott
Regional capitals in Mauritania